Baron Wolman (June 25, 1937 – November 2, 2020) was an American photographer best known for his work in the late 1960s for the music magazine Rolling Stone, becoming the magazine's first chief photographer from 1967 until late 1970.

Early photographic career
A graduate of Northwestern University, where he studied philosophy, Wolman's professional photographic career began in West Berlin in the 1960s while stationed with U.S. Army military intelligence. From Berlin he sold his first photographic essay, images of life behind the then-new Berlin Wall. He then decided to become a photo-journalist. After his discharge he moved from Germany to Los Angeles and then to San Francisco then to New Mexico.

==Rolling Stones chief photographer==

It was in San Francisco, in April, 1967, that Wolman, then 30, met a 21-year-old Cal Berkeley student and freelance writer named Jann Wenner. Wolman had been photographing rock bands and Wenner had plans to form a new kind of music periodical with San Francisco Chronicle music writer, Ralph Gleason. Wolman agreed to join the new periodical, Rolling Stone, and work for free. He also insisted on ownership of all the photographs he took for Rolling Stone, giving the magazine unlimited use of the images. Wolman began working for Rolling Stone from its first issue, and continued for another three years. Because of Wolman's virtually unlimited access to his subjects, his photographs of Janis Joplin, the Rolling Stones, Frank Zappa, the Who, Jimi Hendrix, Joan Baez, Iggy Pop, Pink Floyd, Bob Dylan, the Grateful Dead, Phil Spector, Jim Morrison, Ike & Tina Turner, Peter Rowan, and other musicians were the graphic centerpieces of Rolling Stone'''s layout.

For the most part, Wolman eschewed the studio and never used on-camera strobes, preferring informal portraiture, a style appropriate to both the musicians he was documenting as well as the audience for these photographs. Wolman's approach was gradually supplanted by highly stylized, mostly studio image makers, whose photographs were published only upon the approval of the musician and of his or her management. This evolution can be traced on the subsequent covers of Rolling Stone through the years.

Rags magazine
Although his work at Rolling Stone has come to define his photographic career, Baron has been involved in numerous non-music projects. After leaving Rolling Stone in 1970, Wolman started his own fashion magazine, Rags, housed in Rolling Stones first San Francisco offices. Rags was a counterculture fashion magazine ahead of its time (self-described as "the Rolling Stone of fashion"), focusing on street fashion rather than the fashion found in store windows. Creative and irreverent, the magazine's 13 issues (June 1970 through June 1971) were an artistic although not a financial success.

Later career
Baron followed Rags by learning to fly and making aerial landscapes from the window of his small Cessna. These photographs were the basis of two books, California From the Air: The Golden Coast (1981), and The Holy Land: Israel From the Air (1987), published by Squarebooks which Wolman founded in 1974, and which continues to publish an eclectic selection of illustrated books.

In 1974, Wolman spent a year with the Oakland Raiders football team, using his full-access status to photographically document the entire 1974 season. The result was Oakland Raiders: The Good Guys, published in 1975.

In 2001, Wolman moved to Santa Fe, New Mexico, where he continued to photograph and publish.

2011 saw the release of an auto-biographical, image-heavy book Baron Wolman: Every Picture Tells A Story, the Rolling Stone Years published by Omnibus Press. The book talks about Wolman's career from the beginnings of Rolling Stone and tells the stories behind the photographs.

Wolman was awarded as a VIP at the 2011 Classic Rock Roll of Honour Awards, smashing a camera on stage in homage to Pete Townshend.

Death
Wolman died on November 2, 2020, of complications from ALS at his home in Santa Fe. He was 83 years old. In a final post on social media, he wrote "It’s been a great life, with Love being my salvation always."

Selected publicationsThe Rolling Stone Years: Every Picture Tells a StoryWoodstockGroupies and Other Electric LadiesClassic Rock & Other RollersCalifornia From The Air: The Golden CoastThe Holy Land: Israel From The Air''

References

External links

Baron Wolman's Website
Baron's Instagram
Baron Wolman's Blog
Celebrating Woodstock by Baron Wolman
Iconic manages Baron Wolman Archives
Baron Wolman Vault
Rags Blog
Profile and Video interviews with Baron Wolman at Roadtrip Nation
The legacy of Rolling Stone magazine photographer Baron Wolman, ABC News.

1937 births
2020 deaths
Artists from Santa Fe, New Mexico
American portrait photographers
Artists from Columbus, Ohio
Neurological disease deaths in New Mexico
Deaths from motor neuron disease